HD 129445 b is an eccentric Jupiter gas giant exoplanet orbiting the star HD 129445 which was discovered by the Magellan Planet Search Program in 2010. Its mass is 1.6 times Jupiter's, and it takes 5 years to complete one orbit around HD 129445, a G-type star approximately 210 light years away.

References 

Exoplanets discovered in 2010
Exoplanets detected by radial velocity
Giant planets
Circinus (constellation)